10/12 may refer to:
October 12 (month-day date notation)
December 10 (day-month date notation)